Deontay is a male given name, meaning "of Zeus". Notable people with the given name include:

Deontay Burnett (born 1997), American football wide receiver
Deontay Greenberry (born 1994), American former football wide receiver
Deontay Wilder (born 1985), American professional boxer

See also
Dontay
Deonte